

Palūšė is a tourist village in the Aukštaitija National Park in eastern Lithuania. It is located south-west of Ignalina. The church of Palūšė, built in 1750, is considered to be the oldest surviving wooden church in Lithuania. The church is constructed from wood and was built without using nails, only with saws and axes. It was featured on the one litas banknote. According to the 2011 census, it had 83 residents. Lithuania singer and composer Mikas Petrauskas was born in Palūšė.

Geography  
The village is located on the eastern shore of Lake Lūšiai, 6 km west from the district center, the town of Ignalina.

Notable people 
 Mikas Petrauskas (1873-1937), Lithuanian organist, singer (tenor), conductor, teacher.

References

External links
 Tourism Centre Palūšė 

Resorts in Lithuania
Villages in Utena County
Wooden churches
Resort towns
Wooden buildings and structures in Lithuania